Xiaochikou railway station is a railway station in Huangmei County, Huanggang, Hubei, China. It is currently served by one train, the 6026 from Jiujiang to Machang. It is reportedly the least-used station under Nanchang Railway Bureau.

References

Railway stations in Hubei
Railway stations in China opened in 1996